The Laguna Torre lake is located in the Los Glaciares National Park, Santa Cruz Province, Argentina.  It is formed from glacial melt water and is a popular site for hikers and climbers to see surroundings peaks, including the east face of Cerro Torre.

The glacial lake is sited 10 km west of the El Chaltén tourist village, where it can be easily accessed by hikers between the months October to April.

References

External links
 
 https://www.lonelyplanet.com/south-america/travel-tips-and-articles/top-walks-around-el-chalten

Torre
Tourist attractions in Argentina